Luxembourg is a French railway station on RER B in Paris. It is located under Boulevard Saint-Michel on the border between the 5th and 6th arrondissements, just east of the Jardin du Luxembourg. In 2015, it was used by 5,670,876 passengers.

History
The northern terminus of the Ligne de Sceaux opened at Luxembourg in 1895. Between 1973 and 1977 it was converted into RER B of the Réseau Express Régional network by the building of a 2,600-metre tunnel extending the line under the Seine to Châtelet–Les Halles; the current station was rebuilt 50 cm lower than the previous station.

The station was extensively renovated in 2000. In 2009 it engaged into large excavation work for better accessibility to disabled passengers, including new elevators. In 2010, construction works were stopped due to a building permit issue. For more than two years the ticket offices were relocated in a shelter at street level; all new accesses for disabled passengers were opened in 2019.

On 14 December 1918, a train carrying United States President Woodrow Wilson and his entourage pulled into the station. In less than a month, Wilson would be part of the "Big Three" at the Paris Peace Conference: this Conference drew up the Treaty of Versailles, signed on 28 June 1919, effectively ending the First World War.

Tourism
Jardin du Luxembourg
Panthéon

References

See also

List of RER stations

Railway stations in France opened in 1895
Buildings and structures in the 5th arrondissement of Paris
Buildings and structures in the 6th arrondissement of Paris
Réseau Express Régional stations